Sergey Ivanovich Tikhonovsky (born 26 June 1990) is a Belarusian footballer who plays for Slavia Mozyr.

Career statistics

Club

Honors
Istiklol
 Tajikistan Football League champion: 2018
 Tajik Supercup winner: 2018

References

External links
 
 

1990 births
Living people
Belarusian footballers
Association football midfielders
Belarusian expatriate footballers
Expatriate footballers in Tajikistan
Expatriate footballers in Kazakhstan
Tajikistan Higher League players
FC Torpedo-BelAZ Zhodino players
FC Bereza-2010 players
FC Rudziensk players
FC Dnepr Mogilev players
FC Slavia Mozyr players
FC Vitebsk players
FC Istiklol players
FC Gorodeya players
FC Rukh Brest players
FC Dynamo Brest players
FC Kyzylzhar players